Lothar Vogt (born 17 January 1952) is a German chess FIDE Grandmaster (GM) (1976), two-times East Germany Chess Championship winner (1977, 1979), European Team Chess Championship team bronze medal winner (1970).

Biography
In 1968, Lothar Vogt won East Germany Youth Chess Championship. In 1970s and 1980s he was one of the leaders in East Germany chess, winning two gold medals (Suhl in 1977 and Frankfurt in 1979) in East Germany Chess Championships.

He has appeared in many international chess tournaments, successes including in Warsaw (1969, 1st place), Zinnowitz (1970, shared 1st-2nd place), Starý Smokovec (1972, shared 1st-2nd place and 1979, shared 1st-2nd place), Leipzig (1974, shared 1st-2nd place), Kecskemét (1977, 1st place), Nałęczów (1979, shared 1st-3rd place), Polanica-Zdrój (1982, shared 1st-2nd place in Rubinstein Memorial) and in Valby (1991, shared 1st-4th place). In 2002, Lothar Vogt won the Open tournament in Leukerbad, while in 2006 he ranked the 1st before Andrei Sokolov in Lenk.

Lothar Vogt played for East Germany in the Chess Olympiads:
 In 1972, at second reserve board in the 20th Chess Olympiad in Skopje (+8, =7, -2),
 In 1988, at fourth board in the 28th Chess Olympiad in Thessaloniki (+6, =5, -1).

Lothar Vogt played for East Germany in the European Team Chess Championship:
 In 1970, at tenth board in the 4th European Team Chess Championship in Kapfenberg (+0, =1, -2) and won team bronze medal.

In 1973, he was awarded the FIDE International Master (IM) title and received the FIDE Grandmaster (GM) title three years later.

References

External links

Lothar Vogt chess games at 365chess.com

1952 births
Living people
People from Görlitz
German chess players
East German chess players
Chess grandmasters
Chess Olympiad competitors